Buala is a town in Solomon Islands located on Santa Isabel Island, which is the longest island in Solomon Islands. Buala consists of Jejevo station and Buala Village. Buala is located on a side of a hill so there is no place for the town to expand, new feeder roads have been continuously developed to the east and western ends of the township. One of these roads reached as far as Hovokiolo village in the west Maringe district. Kubolota, Tithiro, and Maglau are villages close to this small town. Higher up inland, are Tirotogna, Bara, Gurena and Kolokofa. People from these villages also frequent Buala town.

The highest point, Mt Kubonitu, can be reached with the help of some tour guide from Tirotogna and Bara village. This peak is close to these two villages. Buala is small and is very limited with things you can do. There is a hospital in the area, but more serious cases are usually flown to Honiara. There is a branch of NBSI bank, now called Bank of South Pacific located in the area where you can do your banking. Again, it is only limited to small amounts since it is small. You are better of to convert any foreign currency while in Honiara.

There is no grocery shop in this area. There is a small market where people come and sell fresh vegetables and fruits every day other than Sunday. There are areas that sell fresh fish, such as Kolofaga Fishery.

This town is close to Fera Island, about 15 minutes boat ride. The airfield is on Fera Island. It is a grass field and only 10 to 15 passenger planes land here. A new terminal block was completed in April 2012.

Climate
Buala has a tropical rainforest climate (Af) with heavy to very heavy rainfall year-round.

References

Populated places in Isabel Province